Bríd Smith (born 18 September 1961) is an Irish People Before Profit–Solidarity politician who has been a Teachta Dála (TD) for the Dublin South-Central constituency since the 2016 general election.

In 2001, she was an ATGWU shop steward and Secretary of the Campaign Against Partnership Deals. She was a spokesperson for the Anti-Bin Tax Campaign. She has addressed the crowd at demonstrations, such as the visit to Dublin by former British Prime Minister Tony Blair and the 2004 protests against the Iraq War. She has criticised health cuts implemented by the government at Cherry Orchard Hospital, and organised a protest against Mary Harney, on behalf of the Save Cherry Orchard Hospital Campaign. She opposed the Treaty of Lisbon. She opposes the alcohol industry's sponsorship of sporting events.

She was elected to Dublin City Council as a People Before Profit candidate for the Ballyfermot-Drimnagh local electoral area in 2009, and re-elected in 2014. Smith was director of elections for the People Before Profit at the 2011 general election. She stood as a candidate in the Dublin constituency at the 2014 European Parliament election, splitting the left vote and being blamed in some quarters for the loss of Paul Murphy's seat.

Smith was elected as TD for Dublin South-Central at the 2016 general election. This had been the fourth time she had stood for the Dáil. On 10 March 2016, at the first sitting of the 32nd Dáil, she seconded the nomination of Richard Boyd Barrett for the role of Taoiseach.

At the general election in February 2020, Smith was re-elected as a TD for the Dublin South-Central constituency.

In July 2020, Bríd Smith was investigated by the Dáil Committee on Procedure for comments she made in the Dáil and online about High Court Judge Mr Justice Garrett Simons, which were described by government TD Charlie Flanagan as "an attack on democracy itself." The previous month, Smith had said in the Dáil that it was "a day when tens of thousands of workers will wake up to the realisation that a learned judge of the High Court, who earns more than €220,000 per year, has decided in his wisdom that an electrician who may earn €45,000 per year is possibly overpaid, and has then struck down a sectoral employment order that will affect tens of thousands of workers already on low pay. This is a war on workers, and it is time for workers to fight back."

References

External links

1961 births
Living people
Local councillors in Dublin (city)
Members of the 32nd Dáil
Members of the 33rd Dáil
21st-century women Teachtaí Dála
People Before Profit–Solidarity TDs